Jewellery or jewelry is a term for personal decorative items to be worn.

It may also refer to:

 Jewellery design
 Jewellery chain
 Jewelry Television

 Jewelry (group), a South Korean music group
 Jewellery (album), a 2009 album by Micachu
 Jewelry (album), a 2019 album by Your Old Droog